Greg Shaw (1949–2004) was an American fanzine publisher, magazine editor, music historian and record label owner.

Greg Shaw may also refer to:

Greg Shaw (judge) (born 1957), justice of the Alabama Supreme Court
Greg Shaw (sledge hockey) (born 1990), American ice sledge hockey player
Greg Shaw (footballer) (born 1970), Scottish footballer (Ayr United, Falkirk FC, Dunfermline Athletic)